Fame is a 1936 British comedy film directed by Leslie S. Hiscott and starring Sydney Howard, Muriel Aked and Miki Hood. It was made at Elstree Studios.

It introduced two new discoveries, Miki Hood and Geraldine Hislop. It was the second film from Herbert Wilcox Productions.

Cast
 Sydney Howard as Oswald Bertwhistle  
 Muriel Aked as Mrs. Bertwhistle 
 Miki Hood as Joan Riley  
 Brian Lawrance as Douglas Cameron  
 Guy Middleton as Lester Cordwell  
 Geraldine Hislop as Geraldine  
 Arthur Finn as Film Director  
 H. F. Maltby as Mayor  
 Herbert Lomas as Rumbold Wakefield  
 Russell Thorndike as Judge  
 Frank Pettingell as Reuben Pendleton  
 Sydney Fairbrother as Train Passenger  
 Maire O'Neill as Mrs. Docker  
 Henry Victor as Actor  
 Frederick Piper as Press Representative

References

Bibliography
 Low, Rachael. Filmmaking in 1930s Britain. George Allen & Unwin, 1985.
 Wood, Linda. British Films, 1927-1939. British Film Institute, 1986.

External links

1936 films
British comedy films
1936 comedy films
1930s English-language films
Films shot at Imperial Studios, Elstree
Films directed by Leslie S. Hiscott
British black-and-white films
1930s British films